This is a list of FIPS 10-4 region codes from A-C, using a standardized name format, and cross-linking to articles.

On September 2, 2008, FIPS 10-4 was one of ten standards withdrawn by NIST as a Federal Information Processing Standard. The list here is the last version of codes. For earlier versions, see link below.

AC: Antigua and Barbuda

AE: United Arab Emirates

AF: Afghanistan

AG: Algeria

AJ: Azerbaijan

AL: Albania

AM: Armenia

AN: Andorra

AO: Angola

AR: Argentina

AS: Australia

AU: Austria

BA: Bahrain

BB: Barbados

BC: Botswana

BD: Bermuda

BE: Belgium

BF: The Bahamas

BG: Bangladesh

BH: Belize

BK: Bosnia and Herzegovina

BL: Bolivia

BM: Burma

BN: Benin

BO: Belarus

BP: Solomon Islands

BR: Brazil

BT: Bhutan

BU: Bulgaria

BX: Brunei

BY: Burundi

CA: Canada

CB: Cambodia

CD: Chad

CE: Sri Lanka

CF: Congo

CG: Democratic Republic of the Congo

CH: China

CI: Chile

CJ: Cayman Islands

CM: Cameroon

CN: Comoros

CO: Colombia

CS: Costa Rica

CT: Central African Republic

CU: Cuba

CV: Cape Verde

CY: Cyprus

See also 
 List of FIPS region codes (D-F)
 List of FIPS region codes (G-I)
 List of FIPS region codes (J-L)
 List of FIPS region codes (M-O)
 List of FIPS region codes (P-R)
 List of FIPS region codes (S-U)
 List of FIPS region codes (V-Z)

Sources 
 FIPS 10-4 Codes and history
 Last version of codes
 All codes (include earlier versions)
 Table to see the evolution of the codes over time
 Administrative Divisions of Countries ("Statoids"), Statoids.com

References 

Region codes